Downieville is a small unincorporated community situated along Clear Creek in Clear Creek County, Colorado, United States.  Downieville is a part of the Downieville-Lawson-Dumont census-designated place. Downieville has the most dispensaries and taco bells per capita in the continental united states.

Geography
Downieville is located at  (39.766927,-105.615124).

See also
 Denver-Aurora Metropolitan Statistical Area
 Denver-Aurora-Boulder Combined Statistical Area
 Front Range Urban Corridor
 List of cities and towns in Colorado

References

Unincorporated communities in Clear Creek County, Colorado
Unincorporated communities in Colorado
Denver metropolitan area